Our Man in Jazz is an album by jazz saxophonist Sonny Rollins, released by RCA Victor  featuring July 1962 performances by Rollins with Don Cherry, Bob Cranshaw, and Billy Higgins. These performances have been described as contrasting from Rollins' previous style by moving to "very long free-form fancies, swaggering and impetuous".

The CD reissue supplements the original LP's three tracks with three tracks recorded in February of the following year, with Henry Grimes replacing Cranshaw on bass. These recordings originally appeared on 3 in Jazz (an LP also featuring performances by Gary Burton and Clark Terry).

Track listing
All compositions by Sonny Rollins except as indicated
 "Oléo" – 25:26  
 "Dearly Beloved" (Jerome Kern, Johnny Mercer) – 8:17  
 "Doxy" – 15:17  
 "You Are My Lucky Star" (Nacio Herb Brown, Arthur Freed) – 3:46 Bonus track on CD rerelease  
 "I Could Write a Book" (Lorenz Hart, Richard Rodgers) – 3:16 Bonus track on CD rerelease  
 "There Will Never Be Another You" (Mack Gordon, Harry Warren) – 5:43 Bonus track on CD rerelease   
Recorded at The Village Gate in New York City on July 27–30, 1962 (tracks 1–3) and February 20, 1963 (tracks 4–6)

Personnel
Sonny Rollins – tenor saxophone
Don Cherry – cornet
Bob Cranshaw – bass 
Henry Grimes – bass (tracks 4–6)
Billy Higgins – drums

References

1962 albums
RCA Victor albums
Sonny Rollins albums
Albums recorded at the Village Gate
albums produced by George Avakian